Speed skating at the 2016 Winter Youth Olympics was held at the Hamar Olympic Hall in Hamar, Norway between 13 and 19 February 2016.

Medal summary

Medal table

Boys' events

Girls' events

Mixed event

Qualification system
Each country could send a maximum of four athletes (two per gender) to the speed skating events of the Winter Youth Olympics. The ISU Junior World Cup competition during the season was used to qualify in the respective distances. The host country (Norway) was given at least one spot.

Quota Allocation
Quota allocation as of December 1, 2015:

References

External links
Results Book – Speed skating

 
2016 Winter Youth Olympics events
Youth Olympics
Youth Olympics, 2016
2016